Charles Wade Mills (January 3, 1951September 20, 2021) was a philosopher who was a professor at Graduate Center, CUNY, and Northwestern University. Born in London, Mills grew up in Jamaica and later became a United States citizen. He was educated at the University of the West Indies and the University of Toronto.

Early life and education
Charles Wade Mills was born on January 3, 1951, in London, England, to Winnifred and Gladstone Mills. His parents were graduate students in London and moved to Kingston, Jamaica, shortly after he was born. He grew up in Kingston.

Mills received a BSc in physics at the University of the West Indies in 1971 and an MA and PhD in philosophy from the University of Toronto in 1976 and 1985, respectively. His dissertation was titled The Concept of Ideology in the Thought of Marx and Engels. He endorsed historical materialism until the 1990s. While at the University of Toronto, Mills helped to unionize teaching assistants.

Academic career 
Mills taught physics in Kingston from 1971 to 1973 at the College of Arts, Science and Technology, and from 1976 to 1977 at Campion College; he later taught philosophy at the University of Oklahoma (1987–90) and the University of Illinois at Chicago (1990–2007) where he was a UIC Distinguished Professor. 

Mills was John Evans Professor of Moral and Intellectual Philosophy at Northwestern University, before his appointment as Distinguished Professor at Graduate Center, CUNY, in August 2016. He was elected a fellow of the American Academy of Arts and Sciences in 2017. He gave the Tanner Lectures on Human Values in 2020.

Views 
Over his career, Mills published six books and over 100 articles. Shannon Sullivan argues that Mills's oeuvre can be understood through the concept of smadditizin, a word Mills used in the title of a 1997 article. Sullivan, quoting Mills, describes smadditizin as "the struggle to have one's personhood recognized" [emphasis in original]. She argues that, no matter whether he embraced Marxism, Black radicalism, or racial liberalism, Mills's work opposed the non-recognition of persons. According to an obituary in CBC News, Mills is regarded as a pioneer in critical race theory and the philosophy of race. Philosopher Christopher Lebron described him in The Nation as a "black Socrates".

Mills's book The Racial Contract (1997) won a Gustavus Myers Outstanding Book Award for the study of bigotry and human rights in North America. The Racial Contract posits that the social contract is really a contract based on the notion of white domination. According to Jamelle Bouie, the work argues that "classic contractarian theories", such as those proposed by "Thomas Hobbes, John Locke, Jean-Jacques Rousseau, and Immanuel Kant", "were built on an assumption of white racial domination, a racial contract, so to speak".

Later in his career, according to Tommie Shelby, Mills launched a sustained critique of John Rawls's contractarian theory of justice. Shelby notes that Mills rejected the Rawlsian turn to ideal theory in political philosophy in favor of an approach that takes careful account of the realities of oppression. Despite his critique of Rawls, however, Mills came to endorse a version of liberalism in Black Rights/White Wrongs: The Critique of Racial Liberalism, suggesting that the history of liberalism reveals the dismantling of social hierarchies. Reviewing Black Rights/White Wrongs in Political Theory, Ainsley LeSure observes that "[t]hough [Mills] acknowledges that racial justice need not be realized through the liberal tradition, he affirms that it can."

Personal life 
Mills has been described as "Afro-Caribbean", "Caribbean", and "Jamaican". He described himself as "Caribbean-American".

In a 2014 publication, Mills stated, "I was a citizen of a small Third World country, Jamaica, which owed its very existence to … oppressive international forces." , Mills was an American citizen.

Mills was diagnosed with metastatic cancer in May 2021. He died of cancer in Evanston, Illinois, on September 20, 2021.

Books

References

Further reading

External links
 Faculty profile at Graduate Center, CUNY

1951 births
2021 deaths
20th-century American philosophers
21st-century American philosophers
British emigrants to Jamaica
Critical race theory
Deaths from cancer in Illinois
Fellows of the American Academy of Arts and Sciences
Graduate Center, CUNY faculty
Jamaican emigrants to the United States
Northwestern University faculty
People with acquired American citizenship
Social philosophers
University of Illinois Chicago faculty
University of Oklahoma faculty
University of the West Indies alumni
University of Toronto alumni